Hélène Agofroy (born 1953) is an artist who lives and works in Paris, France. Her work combines installation, spatial arrangement and performance. Her works are in the FRAC Provence-Alpes-Côte d’Azur (including the 2000 collection catalog).

Artworks
Arrangements was produced in the studio - a fictional space based on the changing arrangements that is created by its occupants. It merges into a single site onto which memories are projected or where personal accounts intermingle.

LAH is a collaboration between three artists, Hélène Agofroy, Lindsay Benedict and Antoine Proux. These are communicated through writing, according to each of their different writing styles and forms of expression. The exchange was printed in red, black and white on a narrow strip of tarpaulin measuring 300 meters by 15 cm. This long print was rolled out along the fence that surrounds  of Jean Tinguely in Milly-la-Forêt, France.

Bibliography

References

External links
Hélène Agofroy official website
16 films of Hélène Agofroy in distribution
Hélène Agofroy : exposition, Quimper, Le Quartier, printemps 1997, exhibition catalog

1973 births
Living people
21st-century French artists
21st-century French women artists
Artists from Paris